or rarely Park Fumiko and Park Munja, was a Japanese anarchist and nihilist. She was convicted of plotting to assassinate members of the Japanese Imperial family.

Early life
Fumiko Kaneko was born in the Kotobuki district of Yokohama during the Meiji period in Japan. Her parents were Fumikazu Saeki, a man from a samurai family, and Kikuno Kaneko, the daughter of a peasant. Because they were not officially married, Fumiko could not be registered as a Saeki. She remained unregistered until she was 8 years old, at which point she was registered as her mother's sister, a fairly common practice for children born out of wedlock. Kaneko recalls that the first few years of her life were fairly happy, as her father was employed as a detective at a police office and cared for his family, though they were fairly poor. However, Fumikazu left his job at the police station, and the family moved around a considerable amount over the next few years. Fumikazu was also increasingly drawn to gambling and drinking, began to abuse Kikuno, and became involved with other women, including Kikuno's sister Takano. Eventually, Fumikazu left Kikuno and married Takano.

During this time, Fumiko was first confronted with the problems of being an unregistered child. Her circumstances made her "invisible to educational authorities," and she was not technically allowed to attend school. Some schools eventually permitted her to attend classes, but she was not called in attendance, did not receive report cards, and was ineligible to receive the official certificate of graduation at the end of a class year. Despite these difficulties, including frequent gaps in her attendance, she did very well in school.
After Fumiko's father left, her mother was involved with several other men, but none of these relationships led to better living circumstances and they were nearly always extremely impoverished. Kikuno even considered selling Fumiko to a brothel, claiming that it would be a better life for her, but she abandoned this plan when it turned out that Fumiko would be sent far away to another region of Japan. After several years of these difficult circumstances, Fumiko lived briefly with her maternal grandparents while her mother remarried again. In 1912, her father's mother, Mutsu Sakei-Iwashita, came to visit, and it was agreed that Fumiko would go back with her to her home in Korea, where she would be adopted by her aunt, who was childless. Before leaving Japan, Fumiko was finally registered as the daughter of her maternal grandparents.

Life in Korea
Shortly after her arrival in Korea, it became clear that Fumiko would not be adopted or provided with the higher level of living that she expected. For the first year or so, they kept up the pretense of including her in their family by allowing her to use the name Iwashita, but after that she was called Kaneko. Her grandmother introduced her to visitors as a child she had taken in out of pity from some people she barely knew and her grandmother and aunt treated her like a maid. It appears that they did initially intend to adopt her, but, at least from Fumiko's perspective, they decided quickly that she was too poorly brought up and unrefined to be their family heir.
	
The only advantage she had was finally being able to attend school regularly, and even her education was limited because her relatives refused to let her read anything besides her required work for school. She was initially promised a high level of education that would eventually lead her to college, but they only allowed her to continue her schooling through the lower primary and higher primary grades and did not attempt to enroll her in a high school. After she finished school, she had to spend all her time working in the house, and she cites this period as the worst of her time in Korea.
	
Fumiko was subjected to extremely poor treatment under her relatives in Korea. Despite their relative wealth, she was only provided with the bare minimum in terms of clothing and living circumstances, and was frequently beaten and deprived of food as a punishment for perceived wrongdoing, sometimes so badly that she contemplated suicide. Her time in Korea also allowed her to observe the mistreatment of the native Koreans by her relatives and other Japanese occupiers.

Return to Japan
In 1919, when she was 16, Fumiko was sent back to her maternal family in Japan, presumably because she was of marriageable age and her grandmother and aunt did not want to have to arrange a match for her. She stayed with her maternal grandparents again and began to form a strong relationship with her Uncle Motoei, who, because of the way she was registered, was officially her brother. By this time, she had reconnected with her birth father, living with him for short periods of time, and he attempted to arrange a marriage between Fumiko and Motoei. The arrangement fell through, because Motoei discovered that Fumiko had developed a relationship with another young man and claimed that her potential loss of virginity suggested by that relationship voided his agreement with her father. Fumiko was sent back to live with her father after this event, but her life there was unpleasant and she was not allowed to follow her desires for a serious education, so she decided to go to Tokyo and pursue a life there.

Experiences in Tokyo
When Fumiko arrived in Tokyo in 1920, she initially lived with her great uncle, but soon managed to get a position as a newspaper girl. She requested an advance on her wages in order to pay her enrollment fees at two different co-ed schools, and started to take classes in mathematics and English. Her job introduced her to a number of groups, most notably the Christian Salvation Army and members of the socialist movement who advocated their philosophies on the street. However, the job was difficult, her employer exploited his workers and was immoral in his personal life, and she hardly had any time to keep up with her school work, so she eventually quit. She then briefly maintained a relationship with the Salvation Army group, but she was not compelled by their beliefs and was abandoned by her one Christian friend after a time because he believed the feelings he was developing for her were threatening his beliefs. While she hoped to escape the hypocrisy she saw in this group by joining the socialist movement, she found that socialists could also behave in ways that seemed to contradict their beliefs, and she eventually abandoned them as well in favor of a more independent activism.

Fumiko was able to attend school on and off in the midst of these life developments, and the major shift in her thinking, from socialism to anarchism and nihilism, began in 1922, when she met Hatsuyo Niiyama at her night school classes. In her memoirs, Fumiko calls Hatsuyo her "closest friend," and mentions that she introduced her to the ideas of foundational nihilist thinkers like Max Stirner, Mikhail Artsybashev, and Friedrich Nietzsche. Around this time, Fumiko was also introduced to a Korean activist named Pak Yol, who shared many of her ideas, and when she finally abandoned the socialist movement she worked with Pak to attempt to accomplish her vision.

Fumiko Kaneko and Pak Yol
Together, Fumiko and Pak published two magazines which highlighted the problems Koreans faced under Japanese imperialism (though they were never directly a part of the Korean independence movement) and showed influences of their radical beliefs. The articles Fumiko wrote for these publications were probably her most obvious activist activity. Sometime between 1922 and 1923, they also established a group called "Futei-sha (Society of Malcontents)," which Fumiko identified as a group advocating for direct action against the government. These activities soon brought Pak and Fumiko under government scrutiny. In September 1923, the hugely destructive Great Kantō earthquake led to massive public anxiety, with many people concerned that the Koreans, who were already agitating for independence from Japan, would use the confusion to start a rebellion. The government therefore made a number of arrests, mostly of Koreans, on limited evidence, and among those arrested were Pak and Fumiko.
	
After lengthy judicial proceedings, Fumiko and Pak were convicted of high treason for attempting to obtain bombs with the intention of killing the emperor or his son. They confessed to this crime, and it appears that at least Fumiko made herself appear guiltier than she actually was, possibly with the intention of sacrificing herself for her cause. During the trial, Fumiko wrote the story of her life as a way of explaining "what made me do what I did," and this memoir is the main source of information about her life, along with court documents. Pak and Fumiko, who had been romantically involved for most of their time together, were legally married a few days prior to their sentencing, which historian Hélène Bowen Raddeker identifies as a move to "underscore the obvious irony in the fact that the Japanese state had united them legally in life before uniting them legally in death." Pak and Fumiko were initially given the death sentence, but an imperial pardon commuted that sentence to life imprisonment. Instead of accepting this pardon, Fumiko tore it up and refused to thank the emperor. While Pak survived his time in prison and was released years later, Fumiko was reported to have committed suicide in her cell in 1926, although there were suspicious circumstances around her death.

Ideological views
Though Fumiko considered the belief systems put forth by the Salvation Army group and the Socialists, she eventually settled on nihilism as her guiding philosophy. Her perception of nihilism changed over time, as is indicated by a statement she made to the court in 1925. She stated, in reference to the strictly negative version of nihilism she originally pursued, that "formerly I said 'I negate life'... [but] my negation of all life was completely meaningless... The stronger the affirmation of life, the stronger the creation of life- negation together with rebellion. Therefore, I affirm life." However, she also takes care to define what this affirmation of life means for a nihilist, which she expects to be very different from the perspectives of the officials: "Living is not synonymous with merely having movement. It is moving in accordance with one's will… one could say that with deeds, one begins to really live. Accordingly, when one moves by means of one's own will and this leads to the destruction of one's body, this is not a negation of life. It is an affirmation."
	
The anarchist cause that she eventually followed was supported ideologically by her rejection of nationalism and the idea of the emperor, as well as a pessimistic belief about the nature of revolutions. In her testimony at her trial, she explained that she and Pak "thought of throwing a bomb [at the emperor] to show he too will die like any other human being," and rejected "the concepts of loyalty to the emperor and love of nation" as "simply rhetorical notions that are being manipulated by the tiny group of privileged classes to fulfill their own greed and interests." Initially, this rejection of the emperor system may have led her to believe in an alternative political system, but after seeing the way members of other groups behaved, she came to believe that any leader, whether the emperor, or other government officials, or a completely new government under socialists, would equally abuse power dynamics and oppress the people. For her, "[revolution] simply means replacing one authority with another," and since she believed that no system of authority could or would operate without oppression, it is logical that she eventually directed her activities towards abolishing all authority. Though she believed, in line with nihilistic thought, that it was not possible to cure the evils in the world, her actions as an anarchist reflect her belief that "even if we cannot embrace any social ideals, every one of us can find some task that is truly meaningful to us. It does not matter whether our activities produce meaningful results or not… this would enable us to bring our lives immediately in to harmony with our existence."
	
While Fumiko did not formally associate herself with any sort of women's movement, she clearly held strong beliefs about the need for equality between men and women. When her great-uncle repeatedly tried to persuade her to abandon the idea of education and "marry a working merchant," she insisted that she could "never become the wife of a tradesman." Though she does not appear to have fully verbalized her reasoning to her great-uncle, she states in her memoir that she wanted to be independent, "no longer… under the care of anybody." Fumiko also expressed concerns that schools specifically for women did not provide equal opportunities, and committed to pursuing her own education only at co-ed schools. Finally, some of the hypocrisy she was most concerned about in the socialist groups had to do with their treatment of women in general, and her in particular. For instance, she broke off a relationship with a fellow socialist, Segawa, after he brushed off a question about the possibility of their relationship leading to pregnancy. She "expected him to take some responsibility," and saw that she "was being toyed with and taken advantage of." Within this context, she challenged the double standard that allowed men to participate in casual relationships without repercussions while women were expected to bear full responsibility for the possible consequences. Additionally, she saw this behavior as further evidence that these men were not truly committed to the ideas they espoused, as real socialism would require a greater level of equality.

In popular culture
Fumiko and, particularly, her trial was portrayed in the 2017 film Anarchist from Colony.
A newspaper containing Fumiko's photograph was discussed in Mr. Sunshine.

See also
Anarchism in Japan
Amakasu Incident
Toranomon Incident
Japanese resistance during the Shōwa period
Assassination attempts on Hirohito

References

Citations

Bibliography

Further reading

External links

1903 births
1926 suicides
Japanese anarchists
People from Yokohama
Korean independence activists
Japanese prisoners sentenced to death
Japanese people who died in prison custody
Prisoners who died in Japanese detention
Prisoners sentenced to death by Japan
Japanese rebels
People who committed suicide in prison custody
Birth registration
Japanese women activists
Murdered anarchists
Death conspiracy theories